Salustiano Antonio Candia (born 8 July 1983) is a Paraguayan football defender.

Career

Candia has played for 2 de Mayo, Godoy Cruz, Olimpo, CD Veracruz, Colón de Santa Fe and for Olimpia of Paraguay. Candia can compensate his limited skills with scrapy play, and excellent leadership skills making him a Leader on and off the pitch.

External links
 
 Argentine Primera statistics  
 Stats in Mexico 
  http://www.fichajes.com/jugador/j15056_salustiano-candia-galeano
 
 

1983 births
Living people
Paraguayan footballers
Paraguay international footballers
Paraguayan expatriate footballers
Association football defenders
Cerro Porteño players
Godoy Cruz Antonio Tomba footballers
2 de Mayo footballers
Club Olimpia footballers
Olimpo footballers
C.D. Veracruz footballers
Club Atlético Colón footballers
Atlante F.C. footballers
Club Libertad footballers
Paraguayan Primera División players
Liga MX players
Argentine Primera División players
Paraguayan expatriate sportspeople in Argentina
Paraguayan expatriate sportspeople in Mexico
Expatriate footballers in Argentina
Expatriate footballers in Mexico